The South Dakota Public Utilities Commission (PUC) regulates the energy, Telecommunications and grain warehouse companies located in South Dakota. The PUC keeps track of the Do Not Call Registry. Commissioners are elected to six-year terms in staggered elections, with special elections should vacancies arise.

References

External links
 South Dakota Public Utilities Commission Website